Rodino is a rural locality (a selo) and the administrative center of Rodinsky Selsoviet, Shipunovsky District, Altai Krai, Russia. The population was 1,253 as of 2013. There are 18 streets.

Geography 
Rodino is located 27 km northwest of Shipunovo (the district's administrative centre) by road. Novoivanovka is the nearest rural locality.

References 

Rural localities in Shipunovsky District